HMS E38 was a British E class submarine built by Fairfield, Govan, Clyde. She was launched on 13 June 1916 and commissioned on 10 July 1917. E38 was sold for scrap in Newport on 6 September 1922.

Design
She was powered by two  Vickers eight-cylinder two-stroke diesel engines and two  electric motors.

E38 was armed with a 12-pounder  QF gun mounted forward of the conning tower. She had five 18 inch (450 mm) torpedo tubes, two in the bow, one either side amidships, and one in the stern; a total of 10 torpedoes were carried.

E-Class submarines had wireless systems with  power ratings; in some submarines, these were later upgraded to  systems by removing a midship torpedo tube. Their maximum design depth was  although in service some reached depths of below . Some submarines contained Fessenden oscillator systems.

Crew
Her complement was three officers and 28 men.

Service
On 19 October 1916, E38 damaged with a torpedo German light cruiser SMS München, withdrawn from active service afterwards.

References

Bibliography
 

 

British E-class submarines of the Royal Navy
Ships built in Govan
1916 ships
World War I submarines of the United Kingdom
Royal Navy ship names